Tayeb Berramla (born January 6, 1985 in Oran) is an Algerian footballer. He currently plays as a midfielder for ASM Oran in the Algerian Ligue Professionnelle 2.

Club career
On January 6, 2016, Berramla signed a contract with MC Oran, joining them on a transfer from RC Relizane.

Honours
 Won the Algerian League once with JS Kabylie in 2008
 Chosen as the Algerian Young Player of the Year in 2007 by DZFoot

References

External links
 DZFoot Profile
 

1985 births
Living people
Footballers from Oran
Algerian footballers
Algerian Ligue Professionnelle 1 players
Algeria under-23 international footballers
ASM Oran players
JS Kabylie players
MC Alger players
MC Oran players
WA Tlemcen players
Algeria youth international footballers
RC Relizane players
Association football midfielders
21st-century Algerian people